Spring Prairie is the name of several places in the United States:

 Spring Prairie Township, Minnesota
 Spring Prairie, Wisconsin, a town
 Spring Prairie (community), Wisconsin, an unincorporated community